Cho Seung-woo (born March 28, 1980) is a South Korean actor and singer. He is best known for his leading roles in the films  The Classic (2003), Marathon (2005), Tazza: The High Rollers (2006), and Inside Men (2015), as well as in the stage musicals Jekyll & Hyde, Hedwig and the Angry Inch, and Man of La Mancha. He is also known for his leading roles in television dramas The King's Doctor (2012), God's Gift: 14 Days (2014), Stranger (2017, 2020), Life (2018), and Sisyphus: The Myth (2021).

Career

2000–2004: Acting debut 
Cho Seung-woo grew up in a musical family: his father Cho Kyung-soo is a singer, and his older sister Cho Seo-yeon acts in musical theatre. Cho himself also dreamed of becoming a musical actor from an early age, however in 1999 while a student at Dankook University he was persuaded to join auditions for Im Kwon-taek's film Chunhyang, and he ended up winning the part from among a field of 1,000 actors. Chunhyang would screen as the first Korean film in competition at Cannes, although domestically it failed to attract much of an audience.

Cho did go on to appear in musicals after his film debut, acting in local productions Subway Line 1 and The Last Empress. Soon he was drawn back into the film industry, however, with a key supporting role in Wanee & Junah (2001), a villainous turn in H (2002), plus a leading role in Who Are U? (2002). In 2003, Cho acted in Kwak Jae-yong's romance The Classic opposite Son Ye-jin, receiving good reviews for his sincere acting. His popularity continued to grow, and in 2004 he appeared in Im Kwon-taek's 99th film Low Life.

2005: Breakthrough with Marathon and Jekyll & Hyde 
Cho's breakthrough would come in early 2005 with the smash hit Marathon, where he played an autistic young man who only finds release in running. The film sold over 5 million tickets, and at age of 26, Cho won several awards for his performance including Best Actor at the 2005 Grand Bell Awards, Best Actor at 2005 Baeksang Arts Awards in film category, as well as Best Actor in the foreign film category at China's Hundred Flowers Awards. Nonetheless, he continued to pursue his career in musicals, with critically acclaimed appearances in Hedwig and the Angry Inch and Jekyll and Hyde.
His success at pursuing both film and musicals make him an unusual case among contemporary actors.

2006–2009: Continued success 
Cho starred in Love Phobia (2006) opposite then-girlfriend Kang Hye-jung; both were praised for their acting, but the melodrama wasn't a commercial success. He then headlined Tazza: The High Rollers with Kim Hye-soo, the 2006 film adaptation of Huh Young-man's same-titled manhwa, which went on to become one of the biggest Korean blockbuster hits of all time.
He followed that with Go Go 70s, about a rock and roll band during the height of the Park Chung-hee military regime; and The Sword with No Name, in which he played a fictional royal guard in love with Empress Myeongseong (Soo Ae).

2010–present: Comeback 
After completing his mandatory military service, Cho made his comeback in the 2010 production of Jekyll and Hyde. The musical was especially meaningful to Cho since the actor rose to stardom when the show premiered in Korea in 2004. Cho's much-anticipated return to the stage was marked with controversy following reports that his salary would be the highest for any musical theatre actor in Korean history. While producers feared that demands for similarly high fees could follow (which could eventually put them out of business), others said that the fee was justified, based on the hope that Cho would help spark a renaissance in a once-vibrant but now-stagnant musical theatre industry. And true enough, when tickets went on sale, the demand was so high that the online reservation server broke down after 15 minutes, with all of the performances in which Cho was scheduled to appear already sold out.

His 2011 sports movie Perfect Game revisited one of the most exciting matches in Korean baseball history, between Choi Dong-won of the Lotte Giants and Sun Dong-yeol of the Haitai Tigers in the summer of 1987, which ended in a tie after being extended 15 innings; the rivalry between the two was further heated up by regionalism at the time with Choi representing the Gyeongsang Province and Sun, the Jeolla Province. Cho starred as Choi opposite Yang Dong-geun as Sun. That same year, Cho also took on the lead role in the musical Zorro.

After lead actor Ju Ji-hoon quit due to vocal chord problems, Cho joined the 2012 stage production of Doctor Zhivago just two weeks ahead of opening, turning the musical into a hit. He and Ryu Deok-hwan then played conjoined twins in actress Ku Hye-sun's sophomore directorial effort The Peach Tree.

Cho made his small screen debut in 2012 with The King's Doctor, a period drama based on a true story about a Joseon-era low-class veterinarian specializing in the treatment of horses who rises to become the royal physician. Cho won the highest award ("Daesang," or Grand Prize) at the MBC Drama Awards for his performance in The King's Doctor, then returned to the stage in 2013 in Hedwig, reprising one of his most memorable musical roles.

Cho continued working in television. He portrayed the poet Yi Sang in Crow's-Eye View, a single-episode anthology as part of MBC's Drama Festival. Cho then starred in the 2014 time travel thriller God's Gift - 14 Days, playing a private investigator who helps a mother (Lee Bo-young) save her child.

Cho reprised one of his most beloved roles in Jekyll and Hyde for the musical's 10th anniversary in late 2014, and the 18,700 tickets sold out in just 10 minutes. Because of his ticket power, he was chosen as among the top 30 most influential people in Korean popular culture in 2006, and for four consecutive years in 2010 to 2014.

Cho next plays a heroic prosecutor who uncovers bribery in the halls of power in Inside Men, a 2015 film adaptation of Yoon Tae-ho's webtoon The Insiders. Inside Men was a box office success with more than 7 million admissions, becoming Cho's highest-grossing film.

In his interview in July 2016, Cho said that after completion of his performance for the musical Sweeney Todd, he decided to take a three-year hiatus from musical to focus on film.

In 2017, Cho starred in tvN's mystery thriller drama Stranger, playing a prosecutor who lacks empathetic abilities. The series was a hit and gained favorable reviews for its tight plot, gripping sequences and strong performances.  Cho's performance in the Stranger also won him an Baeksang Arts Award for Best Actor in TV category.

In 2018, Cho starred in the period film Feng Shui, the third installment of the "divining art trilogy" by Han Jae-rim. He also starred in JTBC's medical drama Life.

In 2020, Cho revived his role in Stranger Season 2 as Hwang Simok.

Filmography

Film

Television series

Music video appearances

Stage

Musical theatre

Musical Concerts

Discography

Bibliography

Ambassadorship

Awards and nominations

References

External links 

 
 
 

1980 births
People from Seoul
Dankook University alumni
Male actors from Seoul
21st-century South Korean male actors
South Korean male film actors
South Korean male musical theatre actors
South Korean male stage actors
South Korean male television actors
Living people